These are the results of the 1986 Ibero-American Championships in Athletics which took place from 27 to 28 September 1986 at Estadio Pedro Marrero in La Habana, Cuba.

Men's results

100 meters

Heat 1 – 27 September
Wind: +1.3 m/s

Heat 2 – 27 September
Wind: -0.5 m/s

Final – 27 September
Wind: +1.8 m/s

200 meters

Heat 1 – 28 September
Wind: +1.8 m/s

Heat 2 – 28 September
Wind: +1.8 m/s

Final – 28 September
Wind: +1.2 m/s

400 meters
Final – 27 September

800 meters
Final – 28 September

1500 meters
Final – 27 September

5000 meters
Final – 28 September

10,000 meters
Final – 27 September

3000 meters steeplechase
Final – 27 September

110 meters hurdles
Final – 27 September
Wind: +1.9 m/s

400 meters hurdles

Heat 1 – 28 September

Heat 2 – 28 September

Final – 28 September

High jump
Final – 27 September

Pole vault
Final – 28 September

Long jump
Final – 28 September

Triple jump
Final – 27 September

Shot put
Final – 27 September

Discus throw
Final – 28 September

Hammer throw
Final – 28 September

Javelin throw
Final – 27 September

20 kilometers walk
Final – 28 September

4x100 meters relay
Final – 28 September

4x400 meters relay
Final – 28 September

Women's results

100 meters

Heat 1 – 27 September
Wind: -1.5 m/s

Heat 2 – 27 September
Wind: +1.5 m/s

Final – 27 September
Wind: +1.3 m/s

200 meters

Heat 1 – 28 September
Wind: +1.5 m/s

Heat 2 – 28 September
Wind: +1.8 m/s

Final – 28 September
Wind: +2.1 m/s

400 meters

Heat 1 – 27 September

Heat 2 – 27 September

Final – 27 September

800 meters
Final – 28 September

1500 meters
Final – 27 September

3000 meters
Final – 28 September

100 meters hurdles
Final – 27 September
Wind: +1.9 m/s

400 meters hurdles
Final – 29 September

High jump
Final – 28 September

Long jump
Final – 27 September

Shot put
Final – 27 September

Discus throw
Final – 28 September

Javelin throw
Final – 27 September

4x100 meters relay
Final – 28 September

4x400 meters relay
Final – 28 September

References

Ibero-American Championships
Events at the Ibero-American Championships in Athletics